Acacia asepala is a shrub belonging to the genus Acacia and the subgenus Phyllodineae endemic to Western Australia.

Description
The glabrous branchlets have minute stipules and tend to be a red-brown colour at the extremities and age to a light-grey colour. It blooms from August and produces yellow flowers.

Taxonomy
The species was first formally described by the botanist Bruce Maslin as part of the work Acacia miscellany. The taxonomy of fifty-five species of Acacia, primarily Western Australian, in section Phyllodineae (Leguminosae: Mimosoideae) as described in the journal Nuytsia. It was reclassified in 2003 as Racosperma asepalum then transferred back to the genus Acacia in 2006.

Distribution
It is native to an area in the Wheatbelt and Goldfields region of Western Australia. It is known from areas around Frank Hann National Park, Marvel Loch and Forrestania where it is a part of open Eucalypt woodland communities growing in sandy-loamy soils.

See also
 List of Acacia species

References

asepala
Acacias of Western Australia
Plants described in 1999
Taxa named by Bruce Maslin